PSEC may refer to:
 UDP-4-amino-4,6-dideoxy-N-acetyl-beta-L-altrosamine transaminase, an enzyme
 Prairie State Energy Campus